Cyperus antillanus is a species of sedge that is native to western and central parts of Cuba.

See also 
 List of Cyperus species

References 

antillanus
Plants described in 1946
Flora of Cuba
Flora without expected TNC conservation status